Charles Debbas (16 April 1885 – 7 November 1935) was a Greek Orthodox Lebanese political figure. He was the first President of Lebanon (before independence) and served from September 1, 1926 till January 2, 1934, under the French Mandate of Lebanon (known as Greater Lebanon). He also served as the Speaker of the Parliament of Lebanon from January 1934 to October 1934.

Personal background
Charles Debbas was born to a prominent Beiruti family of Damascene origin in 1885. He was the son of Gerges Khalil Debbas (1845-1912) and Marie Salim Jbeili. His paternal grandmother, Catherine Bustros, was from a prominent Beiruti family which was closely related to the Sursock family. He studied law in Paris.
He met Marcelle Burgart, a nurse by profession, in a hospital in Paris and married her on October 24, 1919 in Neuilly-sur-Seine.

Professional background
He was appointed on October 20, 1920 Director of Judicial Services of Greater Lebanon in by General of the High Commissioner in Beirut Robert de Caix.
During the period of the French mandate in Lebanon, he was appointed Minister of Justice, then president of the National Assembly, and finally first President of the Republic of Lebanon he was elected president in 1926, then re-elected in 1929 by 42 votes out of 44, he was kept at his post until January 1934 by the French mandate. Under his presidency, the disarmament of Greater Lebanon was decided, and he instituted the compulsory baccalaureate for the exercise of liberal professions. He was also Minister of Justice and President of the Chamber of Deputies in 1934.
In 1934, he delivered a letter of resignation in order to resign from his presidential functions; he will be replaced by Habib Pacha El-Saad.

Masonic activities
He was a member of Freemasonry, initiated in 1907 at the Masonic Lodge Le Liban located in Beirut under the jurisdiction of the Grand Orient de France.

References

1885 births
1935 deaths
Legislative speakers of Lebanon
Eastern Orthodox Christians from Lebanon
Prime Ministers of Lebanon
Presidents of Lebanon
Lebanon under French rule
Lebanese Freemasons
Lebanese people from the Ottoman Empire
Greek Orthodox Christians from the Ottoman Empire
20th-century people from the Ottoman Empire
19th-century people from the Ottoman Empire